Espen Aalberg is a Norwegian jazz musician (drums) known for his contributions in several orchestras like The Core, Shagma, Kwaz, Håvard Lund Quartet and musicians like Jonas Kullhammar, Håvard Wiik and Torbjörn Zetterberg. He also contributes on a series of recordings.

Career
Aalberg played percussion in Namsos percussion ensemble (1988–1994) and became champion in ensemble playing, after which he studied at the "Musikkonservatoriet" in Tromsø and the Jazz Program at Trondheim Musikkonservatorium (1998–2000). (1999–2002). While studying jazz in Trondheim, he formed the innovative band The Core together with fellow students (including Kjetil Møster, Erlend Slettevoll and Steinar Raknes).  He also established the jazz band Shagma in 2004, comprising additional Jørgen Mathisen and Raknes. At the Nattjazz jazz festival in Bergen 2006 he led the band Kwaz comprising Jonas Kullhammar, Håvard Wiik and Torbjörn Zetterberg. In addition Aalberg has contributed within Håvard Lund Quartet.

In 2006 Aalberg and The Core, now as The Indian Core, contributed on The Oslo World Music Festival, after returning from a Tour to India with three hot Indian musicians. The result of this cooperation is manifested on the album The Indian Core (2007).

Aalberg also acts as a drummer in classical music within among others Trondheim Symphony Orchestra, Trondheim Sinfonietta and "Luftforsvarets Musikkorps".

Discography
2004: Vision (Jazzaway), within The Core
2005: Music (Jazzaway), within Shagma
2006: Blue Sky (Jazzaway), within The Core
2007: The Indian Core (Grappa), within The Indian Core including Prasenjit Mitra, Kanchman Babbar & Fateh Ali
2007: Office essentials (Jazzland), within The Core
2007: Meditations on Coltrane (Grappa), within The Core & Bergen Big Band
2008: Golonka Love (Moserobie), within The Core
2008: Så rart (Øra), within Trondheim Sinfonietta
2009: The art of no return, Vol. 1 (Moserobie), within The Core & More
2010: Party (Moserobie), with among others Jonas Kullhammar & Kjetil Møster (recorded, mixed & producer by Aalberg)
2012: Basement Sessions, Vol. 1 (Clean Feed), with Jonas Kullhammar & Torbjörn Zetterberg

References

External links
 Espen Aalberg på Myspace
 The Core
 The Core Myspace

Living people
Musicians from Trondheim
Norwegian military musicians
20th-century Norwegian drummers
21st-century Norwegian drummers
Norwegian jazz drummers
Male drummers
Norwegian jazz composers
Male jazz composers
20th-century Norwegian male musicians
21st-century Norwegian male musicians
Year of birth missing (living people)
The Core (band) members